Rosanda Mok Ka-han (born 23 May 1972) is a Democratic Party politician in Hong Kong and a member of Wong Tai Sin District. She is the former chairman of the pro-democracy pro-grassroots Hong Kong Association for Democracy and People's Livelihood (ADPL) and former member of the Kowloon City District Council for Ma Tau Wai.

Biography
Rosanda Mok was born in 1972 and graduated from the Chinese University of Hong Kong with a master's degree in Sociology. She joined the Hong Kong Association for Democracy and People's Livelihood (ADPL), a local-based pro-grassroots pro-democratic party and was first elected to the Kowloon City District Council through Ma Tau Wai in the 1999 District Council election and re-elected for three times until she was unseated by the pro-Beijing Democratic Alliance for the Betterment and Progress of Hong Kong (DAB) newcomer Terence Siu Tin-hung in the 2015 election with a narrow margin of 45 votes. 
 
She has also hold public positions including the Buildings Appeal Tribunal Panel, the Gas Safety Appeal Board Panel, and the Obscene and Indecent Articles Panel of Adjudicators.

On 23 January 2016, Mok was elected the first female chair of the ADPL, succeeding veteran Bruce Liu. Her chairmanship lasted for less than a year as in September the same year, Mok resigned from the chairperson post of ADPL because her party suffered a historic defeat in losing its only seat in the 2016 legislative election. She was succeeded by Sze Tak-loy.

In 2017, after a legislative seat in West Kowloon was vacated following the oath-taking controversy, veteran lawmaker and former chairman Frederick Fung sought for nominations from ADPL to contest the March 2018 Kowloon West by-election. However, Mok insisted the party should nominate a younger member instead. She left the ADPL on 26 June 2017 after the party resolved to nominate Fung. She later joined the Democratic Party.  In 2019, she fought the Wong Tai Sin District Council seat vacated by party chairman Wu Chi-wai, and retained the seat.

References

External links 
 

1972 births
Living people
District councillors of Kowloon City District
District councillors of Wong Tai Sin District
Alumni of the Chinese University of Hong Kong
Hong Kong Association for Democracy and People's Livelihood politicians
Democratic Party (Hong Kong) politicians
Hong Kong women in politics